Timothy Donald Locastro (born July 14, 1992) is an American professional baseball outfielder in the New York Mets organization. He has played in Major League Baseball (MLB) for the Los Angeles Dodgers, Arizona Diamondbacks and New York Yankees. He holds the MLB record for most successful stolen bases to start a career, with 29.

Career

Amateur career
Locastro played high school baseball at Auburn High School in Auburn, New York, and then played college baseball at Ithaca College, where he was the Empire 8 player of the year in 2013 when he set school records for runs and stolen bases. He was drafted by the Toronto Blue Jays in the 13th round of the 2013 MLB draft and signed with them on June 13.

Toronto Blue Jays
Locastro played for the Bluefield Blue Jays of the Appalachian League in 2013, hitting .283 in 43 games. The following season, he was selected to play in the Northwest League mid-season all-star game, and he hit .313 in 67 games for the Vancouver Canadians and also stole 32 bases while being caught only four times. He began the 2015 season with the Lansing Lugnuts of the Midwest League, where he hit .310 with 30 steals in 70 games.

Los Angeles Dodgers

Locastro was traded to the Los Angeles Dodgers (along with Chase De Jong) on July 2, 2015, in exchange for three international signing slots. He was assigned to the Rancho Cucamonga Quakes and helped them to the California League championship. He began 2016 with Rancho Cucamonga again and was promoted mid-season to the Double-A Tulsa Drillers. Between the two teams, he was in 131 games, hitting .285 with 24 steals. The Dodgers assigned him to the Glendale Desert Dogs of the Arizona Fall League after the season. In 2017 he was selected to the Texas League mid-season all-star game and between Tulsa and AAA Oklahoma City, he hit .308 in 127 games with 34 steals.

Locastro was called up to the majors for the first time on September 29, 2017. He was called up to be evaluated for possible use as an impact pinch runner in the playoffs. He made his MLB debut that night against the Colorado Rockies, running for Corey Seager in the eighth inning and remaining in the game to play an inning in left field. He became the first Ithaca player to play in MLB since Glen Cook appeared in nine games for the Texas Rangers in 1985. The following day, Locastro again appeared as a pinch runner, and stole third base for his first major league steal. He did finally get an at-bat, in his third and final appearance for the Dodgers this season, on October 1. He pinch hit against Adam Ottavino and popped out to second. He was not added to the post-season roster. Locastro was designated for assignment on November 20, 2018.

Arizona Diamondbacks
The day after being designated, Locastro was traded to the New York Yankees for minor league pitcher Drew Finley and cash. On January 16, 2019, the Yankees traded Locastro to the Arizona Diamondbacks for minor league pitcher Ronald Roman and cash. 

In 2019, Locastro batted .250/.357/.340, and stole 17 bases without being caught (bringing his career major league record to 22 stolen bases without being caught), leading the major leagues in stolen base percentage. He had the fastest sprint speed of all major league players, at 30.8 feet/second. He finished the season with a BABIP of .243 on ground balls. He also set the MLB record for most hit by pitches (22, or 8.8%) with fewer than 300 plate appearances, which in turn inflated his on base percentage (.357).

In 2020 he batted .290/.395/.464 in 69 at bats with 15 runs, two home runs, seven RBIs, and four stolen bases in four attempts, and was hit by pitches four times. He had yet to record a caught stealing in his career. He had the fastest sprint speed of all major league players, at 30.7 feet/second.

On April 10, 2021, he broke the record for number of stolen bases to start a career without being caught stealing (28), a record previously held by Tim Raines. On April 17, Locastro got caught stealing for the first time in his career, being thrown out by Yan Gomes of the Washington Nationals. In the play, he also jammed his finger and was placed on the 10-day injured list after the game and was reinstated May 3. In 55 games with Arizona in 2021, Locastro slashed .178/.271/.220 with one home run and five RBIs.

New York Yankees
On July 1, 2021, the Diamondbacks traded Locastro to the New York Yankees in exchange for Keegan Curtis. On July 11, Locastro hit his first Yankees home run against Framber Valdez of the Houston Astros. Locastro played in nine games (batting 4-for-21) for the Yankees before suffering a torn anterior cruciate ligament while catching a fly ball off the bat of Boston Red Sox outfielder Alex Verdugo on July 17, ending his 2021 season.

On November 5, 2021, Locastro was claimed off waivers by the Boston Red Sox. However, he was non-tendered on November 30, making him a free agent. On March 13, 2022, Locastro was signed by the Yankees to a one-year major league deal. He began the 2022 season with the Scranton/Wilkes-Barre RailRiders and was promoted to the major leagues on April 17.

New York Mets
On January 9, 2023, Locastro signed a minor league contract with the New York Mets organization with a spring training invitation.

References

External links

1992 births
Living people
American expatriate baseball players in Canada
Arizona Diamondbacks players
Arizona League Dodgers players
Auburn High School (Auburn, New York) alumni
Baseball players from New York (state)
Baseball second basemen
Baseball shortstops
Bluefield Blue Jays players
Glendale Desert Dogs players
Ithaca Bombers baseball players
Lansing Lugnuts players
Los Angeles Dodgers players
Major League Baseball outfielders
New York Yankees players
Oklahoma City Dodgers players
Rancho Cucamonga Quakes players
Reno Aces players
Scranton/Wilkes-Barre RailRiders players
Sportspeople from Auburn, New York
Tulsa Drillers players
Vancouver Canadians players